Vasile Ioan Godja (19 October 1954 — 1 August 2016) was a Romanian football player and manager.

Godja was head coach of Tractor an Iranian football club during the early 1990s, while working for Iran Tractor Manufacturing Co. (ITMCO), one of the industries in Tabriz, Iran.

Playing career
Between 1970 and 1986 Godja played for local clubs Metrom Brașov, Steagul Roșu Brașov (now known as FC Brașov) and Tractorul Brașov.

Managerial career
After retiring as a player, Godja managed the youth team of his hometown Tractorul Brașov. He obtained his coaching license at A.N.E.F.S. Bucharest in 1988.

From 1990–96, Godja was in this period the coach of Iranian football side Tractor, under his lead the club promoted from the third league to the first league. In the 1992–93 season, he led the club to a third-place finish in the Azadegan League top flight.

During the 1995–96 season Tractor were playing in the second league, Godja managed to promote the team once again into the first league. Under his leadership, Tractor were runners-up of the Hazfi Cup in 1994, and won in 1995 the MILLS International cup in India.

He was appointed again in July 2003 and spent six months without success before being replaced in December.

Discovery of footballers in Iran
Godja discovered and trained various players such as Karim Bargheri, Sirous Dinmohammadi, Alireza Nikmer and Hossein Khatibi all went to represent the Iran national team early in their careers.

Death
Godja died on 1 August 2016, at the age of 61, after struggling for several years with an incurable disease.

References

1954 births
2016 deaths
Sportspeople from Brașov
Romanian footballers
Romanian football managers
Tractor S.C. managers
Expatriate football managers in Iran
Romanian expatriate sportspeople in Iran
Romanian expatriate football managers
Association footballers not categorized by position